Maggie Foster may refer to:

Maggie Foster, character in George (1993 TV series)
Maggie Foster, character in Revolution (TV series)

See also
Margaret Foster (disambiguation)